Death Ride 69 is the first studio album by Death Ride 69, released in 1988 by Little Sister Records.

Track listing

Personnel 
Adapted from the Death Ride 69 liner notes.

Death Ride 69
 Don Diego – bass guitar, vocals
 Linda LeSabre – drums, vocals
 Wrex Mock – electric guitar and vocals (A1–A4, B5)

Additional musicians
 Danny Frankel – percussion (A3)
 Dave Haas – electric guitar (B1–B4)
Production and additional personnel
 Scott Arundale – production
 Bar-Min-Ski – cover art
 John Girdler – engineering, mixing
 Merlyn Rosenberg – photography

Release history

References

External links 
 

1988 debut albums
Death Ride 69 albums